E. Madhusudhanan (1 July 1941 - 5 August 2021) was a politician from the Indian state of Tamil Nadu.

Since 2007, he was the Presidium Chairman of the All India Anna Dravida Munnetra Kazhagam party till his death. One of the oldest party members of All India Anna Dravida Munnetra Kazhagam, since its inception he was also a former Minister in Jayalalitha cabinet and former spokesman. He was elected to the Tamil Nadu Legislative Assembly as an All India Anna Dravida Munnetra Kazhagam candidate from Dr. Radhakrishnan Nagar constituency in 1991 assembly election. He served as Minister of Handlooms and Textiles in First Jayalalithaa ministry.

Electoral performance

References 

1940s births
Year of birth uncertain
2021 deaths
People from Chennai
All India Anna Dravida Munnetra Kazhagam politicians
Tamil Nadu ministers
Tamil Nadu MLAs 1991–1996